Dark City is a 1950 American film noir crime film starring Charlton Heston in his Hollywood debut, and featuring Lizabeth Scott, Viveca Lindfors, Dean Jagger, Don DeFore, Ed Begley, Jack Webb and Harry Morgan. It was produced by Hal B. Wallis and directed by William Dieterle.

This was Heston's first appearance in a professional film production, following his participation in David Bradley's amateur Peer Gynt (1941) and semi-professional Julius Caesar (1950). In later interviews, he would refer to Dark City as "definitely not an 'A' picture, but a pretty good 'B'." Webb and Morgan would go on to famously co-star in the popular police drama television series Dragnet.

Plot
Danny Haley is an owner of an illegal gambling location that the police raid even though he pays the police for protection. Danny hangs out at a café where he listens to singer Fran Garlan. Fran is in love with Danny but Danny tells her that he cannot commit to a relationship and that she is just a girlfriend.

Later that evening at the café, Danny meets businessman and Air Force veteran Arthur Winant, who is in town to buy some equipment for a sports club. When Danny notices a check for $5,000 in Winant's wallet, he invites Winant to play poker at his closed establishment with Danny's pals Soldier, Barney and Augie. During the game, Winant talks about his older brother Sidney, who is coming to meet him late the next evening. Barney and Augie let Arthur win $325, but the next evening, they cheat Arthur out of all his money and the $5,000, which is not his.

The next day, Danny learns that Winant has committed suicide. Fearing police attention, Danny tells his friends to wait a few days before cashing Winant’s check. Barney, the most nervous of the group, thinks that someone is following him, and the next morning he is found dead.

Police captain Garvey interviews Danny and Augie and tells them that he knows that there is a connection between Winant's death and the poker game, and that Winant left a letter for his brother Sidney. He informs them that Sidney is a dangerous criminal and likely to avenge his brother's death, and that Barney was probably killed by Sidney. Danny and Augie deny any connection with Winant's death.

Danny and Augie try to find Sidney before he finds them. In Los Angeles, Danny poses as an insurance agent and visits Winant's widow Victoria, telling her that he needs to locate Sidney, the beneficiary of Winant's life-insurance policy, and that Victoria will be the beneficiary if Sidney is not found. Victoria cannot provide a photo of Sidney because she has destroyed them. Danny spends a romantic evening with Victoria, but when he reveals his true identity, she then chases him out in a rage. Danny tries to give her Winant’s check, but she refuses to accept it.

Returning to his motel, Danny finds Augie's body hanging from the shower in his room. The police arrest Danny after the hotel manager tells them that he heard both men arguing loudly the day before. Captain Garvey arrives in Los Angeles and, believing Danny to be innocent, persuades the local police to release Danny, provided that he immediately leaves the city.

Danny travels to Las Vegas, where Soldier works at a casino. Soldier gets Danny a job as a blackjack dealer. Fran comes to Las Vegas, and Soldier finds her a job as a singer in the casino's lounge.

After work one day, Danny goes to a nearby casino to play craps and builds a small stake into more than $10,000. Victoria phones and warns Fran that Sidney knows that Danny is in Las Vegas. Danny asks Fran to send the money that he had won to Victoria the next morning if anything should happen to him. Believing that Danny is in love with Victoria, Fran decides to leave for Chicago.

Danny waits in his motel room with a gun in his hand. However, Sidney emerges from the bathroom, catching Danny by surprise; after a struggle, he chokes Danny. Captain Garvey and his men, who were following Danny all along, burst into the room and shoot Sidney.

The next morning at the airport, Danny catches Fran before she boards her plane to tell her that he loves her. They kiss and walk back into the airport.

Cast
 Charlton Heston as Danny Haley/Richard Branton
 Lizabeth Scott as Fran Garland
 Viveca Lindfors as Victoria Winant
 Dean Jagger as Capt. Garvey
 Don DeFore as Arthur Winant
 Jack Webb as Augie
 Ed Begley  as Barney
 Harry Morgan as Soldier
 Walter Sande as Swede
 Mark Keuning as Billy Winant
 Mike Mazurki as Sidney Winant

Production notes
The film, with a working title of No Escape, was produced between April 5 and May 12, 1950 with additional scenes and retakes completed between May 9 and May 11. Several Los Angeles locations were used: Griffith Observatory, Union Station, North Hollywood, an amusement pier in Ocean Park, the Wilshire Plaza Hotel and the Valley Vista Motel in the San Fernando Valley. Background shots were also filmed in Las Vegas and Chicago.

Reception

Critical response
Upon the film's release, New York Times critic Bosley Crowther applauded the work of newcomer Heston but panned the film, writing:

In 2004, film critic Dennis Schwartz gave the film a mixed review, writing:

References

External links
 
 
 
 
 Dark City informational site and DVD review at DVD Beaver (includes image)
 

1950 films
1950 crime drama films
American black-and-white films
American crime drama films
Film noir
American films about revenge
Films about suicide
Films directed by William Dieterle
Films produced by Hal B. Wallis
Films scored by Franz Waxman
Films set in Chicago
Films set in the Las Vegas Valley
Films set in Los Angeles
Films about gambling
Paramount Pictures films
Films about poker
1950s English-language films
1950s American films